Mia Mingus is an American writer, educator, and community organizer who focuses on issues of disability justice. She is known for coining the term "access intimacy". She advocates for disability studies and activism to centralize the experiences of marginalized people within disability organizing. She is a prison abolitionist, and she advocates for transformative justice in her work against child sexual abuse.

Personal life 
Mingus self-describes as a "physically disabled, queer Korean transracial and transnational adoptee" and a survivor of child sexual abuse. All of these identities are integral to her work as an activist.

Childhood 
Mingus was born in Korea and adopted by white parents when she was an infant. She was raised on the island of St. Croix in the U.S. Virgin Islands. She has a younger sister who was also adopted.

When Mingus was a child, her mother and nine other women founded the Women's Coalition of St. Croix, the first organization on the island dedicated to helping victims of domestic violence, rape, and sexual assault. Mingus's childhood experiences with this organization and the feminist community on the island would later inspire her own work as an activist. These experiences also led her to understand that, as she wrote in a 2018 blog post, "violence...was systemic and more than just a couple of 'bad apples.' It was happening in every community."

Education 
Mingus attended school in the Virgin Islands until she was 17 years old. She then attended Agnes Scott College, an all-women's school in Decatur, Georgia, where she earned her degree in Women's Studies. While volunteering at the National Human for Rights Education Center in high school, Mingus was introduced to Loretta Ross, an African American reproductive justice activist. Through similar volunteering, Mingus was able to earn a community service scholarship to go to college.

Career

Early career 
After graduation, Mingus began her career by working at a feminist bookstore in Atlanta, Charis Books & More. Through Charis, Mingus found an activist community, including a group called Queer Girls, which threw house parties specifically for queer women of color. Later, Mingus worked at Georgians for Choice, an organization associated with the National Abortion Reproductive Rights Action League (NARAL). Later, Mingus was accepted to a reproductive justice fellowship in Chicago. She later became the co-director at Georgians for Choice. Mingus also served on the board of SPARK: Reproductive Justice NOW as the co-founder and co-leader.

Mingus was a part of numerous national coalitions such as Causes in Common, which focused on achieving reproductive rights, health, and justice work for the LGBTQ+ community. She was also a part of the Access Project, NILNY, CLPP(Civil Liberties and Public Policy), and more. Mingus built a partnership with the Atlanta Transformative Justice Collaborative [ATJC], between SPARK and CWPE, and also Project South.

Current career 
Mia Mingus's work focuses on disability justice as a means of liberation. Mingus founded the Living Bridges Project, which focuses on listening to people's responses regarding child sexual abuse. The goal of this project is to offer support and resources to survivors. Similarly, Mingus is the cofounder and core member of the Bay Area Transformative Justice Collective (BATJC), which also collects such child sexual abuse stories and further creates transformative justice responses that promote healing and accountability.

Currently, Mingus has a popular blog titled Leaving Evidence, where she focuses on different social justice issues. Her articles have been showcased in numerous magazines and publications.

Known for 
Mingus' approach to disability justice focuses on dismantling privilege: "We don't want to simply join the ranks of the privileged; we want to dismantle those ranks and the systems that maintain them" (Mingus, 2011, para. 5) 

She is especially well known for her work on 'collective access.' Collective access emphasizes how disability interacts with other aspects of an individual's identities, making disability justice activism necessarily intertwined with anti-racist, feminist, reproductive justice, queer, and prison abolitionist activism. Emphasizing solidarity between movements, collective access focuses on community-supported access and mutual independence instead of individualized specific accommodations.

Mingus believes that ensuring access or participation for disabled people is not considered justice, but rather people must transform their subjective realities at the core of their humanity to ensure community. Mingus preaches the idea that a focus on exclusion causes people to lose focus on inclusion.

A key element of Mingus's work is her embrace of interdependence. She believes that people needed to rid the myth of independence as interdependency is what forms communities. This concept can be further broken down into the term "access intimacy". Access intimacy is a concept that Mingus formulated as she believed that people can understand and be there for each other, which will provide an unexpected amount of comfort. Mingus believed that the disabled community was missing access intimacy.

Accomplishments 
 (2008) Creating Change award, National Gay and Lesbian Task Force 
 (2010) Forty under 40, The Advocate 
 (2011) Femmes of Color Symposium Keynote Address 
 (2013) Queer and Asian Conference Keynote Address 
 (2013) API women's Champion of Change, President Barack Obama.
 (2013) 100 Women We Love, GO
 (2018) Disability Intersectionality Summit Keynote Address
(2020) Ford Foundation Disability Futures Fellow

References

External links 

 Official website

American disability rights activists
American LGBT writers
American writers of Korean descent
American LGBT people of Asian descent
Living people
American feminist writers
Year of birth missing (living people)
Queer writers
Queer women
South Korean adoptees
21st-century American women